Achen (Lorraine Franconian: Ache) is a commune in the Moselle department of the Grand Est administrative region in north-eastern France. The village belongs to the Pays de Bitche.

Population

See also 
 Communes of the Moselle department

References

External links 
 

Communes of Moselle (department)